The Hong Kong Film Award for Best Costume Make Up Design is an award presented annually at the Hong Kong Film Awards for a film with the best costume and makeup design. As of 2016 the current winner is Yee Chung-Man for his work on Monster Hunt.

Winners and nominees

References

External links
 Hong Kong Film Awards Official Site

Hong Kong Film Awards